Advanced Dynamic Audio Monitors (ADAM) Audio was founded in March 1999 in Berlin, Germany. The company develops, manufactures, and distributes (active) loudspeakers. The company provides solutions for Home Studio, Professional Audio, Audiovisual Production, Home Audio, Education & Research, and, installations.

History 
ADAM Audio was founded in 1999 starting with the development of their eXtended Accelerating Ribbon Technology (X-ART) tweeter, based on the invention of the Air Motional Transformer by Oskar Heil in the 1960's. 

The Berlin based factory currently employs a staff of 55; the company is represented in more than 75 countries.

See also 
 List of studio monitor manufacturers

References

External links
 Official website 
 Official website 
 Official website 
 Official website 
 Official website 

Manufacturing companies based in Berlin
Loudspeaker manufacturers
Audio equipment manufacturers of Germany